Scott Warner (born in Latrobe, Pennsylvania) is a U.S.-based lighting designer who has recently designed for Icona Pop, Train, The Pussycat Dolls, Jimmy Eat World, Everclear, David Cook, and   Gavin Degraw. Warner started his career is the late 1980s with the Pittsburgh-based bands, The Affordable Floors and The Cynics. His first national client was the shock rock group GWAR.

Scott is currently the Lighting Designer and Director for Stone Sour, Erika Jayne, Queen Latifah and Lighting Director for Alice Cooper.

Education and career
A student at the Greater Latrobe High School in Latrobe, Pennsylvania, Warner was active in the school's theater program. In 1983, he was a member of the school's production of "Mame."

Recording Era
In the late 1980s and early 1990s, Warner was an Independent Producer and Engineer, recording out of studios in Pittsburgh and New York. His main studio was The Flagrant Underground, a 16 track studio in Pittsburgh. In 1988 while working for Zanzibar Records, Scott recorded a song titled "Zip It" that he was contracted to write for talk show host Morton Downey Jr. The song was played on Downey's show as well as the Dr. Demento show. Downey endorsed the record, but a dispute with his network forced the label to stop distributing the record. The song can be heard in the film Évocateur: The Morton Downey Jr. Movie.

The Robe Robin Cyclone
Warner has teamed up with Robe Lighting based in the Czech Republic to create an innovative lighting fixture called The Cyclone. This one of a kind effects moving head product has an integrated fan in the centre of the head surrounded by a ring of 24 x high powered RGBW multichip LEDs. The Cyclone made its live debut with the Swedish group Icona Pop while supporting Miley Cyrus on her 2014 US tour and the UK leg of Katy Perry's 2104 tour.

The Cyclone also made its NLH Hockey debut with the Pittsburgh Penguins during their 2014 season opener. The Cyclone has been used by Kaiser Chiefs, Lady Gaga, Sublime With Rome, Oscar and The Wolf (MIA Awards), The "14-18 Spektakel Musical," Charli XCX, the Trans-Siberian Orchestras "Ghosts Of Christmas Eve" tour, SpaceXperience, BodyGuard Musical, The Blue Man Group in Las Vegas and Alice Cooper's 2019 European Tour.

Cyclone Award Nominations
 Nominated for the 2014 "Indispensable Technology in Lighting" Parnelli Award
 Nominated for selection in the PLASA 2013 Awards for Innovation.

Lighting design and direction clients
Stone Sour
Lady Gaga (supporting Pussycat Dolls)
Daughtry
Tinashe
Keyshia Cole
Alice Cooper
Steve Vai
Porcelain Black
Smokey Robinson
Howie Day
Train
Queen Latifah
The Pussycat Dolls
Mindless Behavior
Jimmy Eat World
Icona Pop
Vertical Horizon
Bad Religion
Gavin Degraw
Everclear
Nickelback (supporting Everclear)
AFI
David Cook
Fuel
Indigo Girls
Buffalo Tom
The Misfits (co-headling with GWAR)
The Toadies
Dog's Eye View
Goo Goo Dolls
Plastilina Mosh
GWAR
MC5 Supporting Alice Cooper
Black Stone CherrySupporting Alice Cooper
Eve  Australian 2008 Tour Lighting Designer
SnoCore Tour 1999 SnoCore Lighting Designer
INXS VM World Convention 2010
Sublime with Rome 2013 Tour Design
Don Henley 2016 European Tour 
Gwen Stefani 2017 Hawaii and Dubai Performances
Yes (band) 2019 Japanese Tour

Productions
GWAR "Penguin Attack" Music Video/ Lighting Director
GWAR "Saddam A-GoGo" Music Video/ Lighting Director
Carolina Liar "King Of Broken Hearts" Music Video/ Director and Producer
The Mayfield Four "Sick and Wrong" Music Video/ Director
Steve Vai "Live At The Astoria" DVD Lighting Director
The PussyCat Dolls Live from Manchester Evening News Arena Video Lighting Designer/Director
Everclear "When It All Goes Wrong Again" Video Band Performance Lighting Director
David Cook "Fade Into Me" Video Lighting Director (live performance)
Porcelain Black "Mama Forgive Me" Music Video/ Lighting Designer/Director
Watson's Awakening  "Cobwebs Of The Mind" Music Video/ Director

References

American lighting designers
Year of birth missing (living people)
Living people
Lighting engineers
American music video directors
People from Latrobe, Pennsylvania